The 2008–09 NOJHL season was the 31st season of the Northern Ontario Junior Hockey League (NOJHL). The eight teams of the East and West Divisions played 50-game schedules.

The top teams of each division played for the Copeland-McNamara Trophy, the NOJHL championship. The winner of the Copeland-McNamara Trophy competed in the Central Canadian Junior "A" championship, the Dudley Hewitt Cup.

Changes 
Temiscaming Royals join league from Greater Metro Junior A Hockey League.
Soo re-enters league as Soo Eagles.

Final standings
Note: GP = Games played; W = Wins; L = Losses; OTL = Overtime losses; SL = Shootout losses; GF = Goals for; GA = Goals against; PTS = Points; x = clinched playoff berth; y = clinched division title; z = clinched conference title

Teams listed on the official league website.

Standings listed on official league website.

2008-09 Copeland-McNamara Trophy Playoffs

Playoff results are listed on the official league website.

Dudley Hewitt Cup Championship
Hosted by the Schreiber Diesels in Schreiber, Ontario.  Soo finished in fourth.

Round Robin
Fort William North Stars (SIJHL) 2 - Soo Thunderbirds 0
Schreiber Diesels (SIJHL) 2 - Soo Thunderbirds 0
Kingston Voyageurs (OJHL) 3 - Soo Thunderbirds 0

Scoring leaders 
Note: GP = Games played; G = Goals; A = Assists; Pts = Points; PIM = Penalty minutes

Leading goaltenders 
Note: GP = Games played; Mins = Minutes played; W = Wins; L = Losses: OTL = Overtime losses; SL = Shootout losses; GA = Goals Allowed; SO = Shutouts; GAA = Goals against average

Awards
Player of the Year - Nick Minardi (Soo Thunderbirds)
Most Valuable Player - Nick Minardi (Soo Thunderbirds)
Most Gentlemanly Player - Tyler Liukkonen (Blind River Beavers)
Rookie of the Year - Erik Belanger (Sudbury Jr. Wolves)
Top Defenceman - Drew Otto (Soo Thunderbirds)
Most Improved Player - Tanner Burton (Blind River Beavers)
Top Defensive Forward - Gerrit Weller (Blind River Beavers)
Top "Team Player" - Felix Boutin (Abitibi Eskimos)
Director of the Year - Oscar Cloutier (Sudbury Jr. Wolves)
Coach of the Year - Ian Swalucynski (North Bay Skyhawks)
Team Goaltending Award - Jeff Michael, Riley Ross (North Bay Skyhawks)
Top Goals Against Average - Jeff Michael (North Bay Skyhawks)
Scoring Champion - Dustin Fummerton (North Bay Skyhawks)
Scholastic Player of the Year - Giles Pickard (Blind River Beavers)
Playoffs Most Valuable Player - Ryan Dube (Soo Thunderbirds)

See also 
 2009 Royal Bank Cup
 Dudley Hewitt Cup
 List of NOHA Junior A seasons
 Ontario Junior Hockey League
 Superior International Junior Hockey League
 Greater Ontario Junior Hockey League

References

External links 
 Official website of the Northern Ontario Junior Hockey League
 Official website of the Canadian Junior Hockey League

NOJHL
Northern Ontario Junior Hockey League seasons